Lee James "Dixie" Stokes Jr. (August 24, 1913 – December 1967) was an American football player. 

Stokes was born in Haslam, Texas, in 1913. He grew up in Shreveport, Louisiana, attended C. E. Byrd High School, and then played college football at Centenary.

He also played professional football in the National Football League (NFL) as a center for the Detroit Lions from 1937 to 1940. He was released by the Lions after the 1940 season and took a job with a Michigan tool company. He made a comeback in 1943 with the Chicago Cardinals, maintaining his weekday job with the tool company while playing football on weekends. He appeared in 28 NFL games, 15 as a starter.

Stokes married Helen Rosenblath in 1938. From 1940 until his death in 1967, he worked as the sales manager of a tool company in Memphis, Michigan. He died from a heart attack in Forrest City, Arkansas, at age 54.

References

1913 births
1967 deaths
People from Shreveport, Louisiana
American football centers
Centenary Gentlemen football players
Detroit Lions players
Chicago Cardinals players
Players of American football from Louisiana